Dáša Vokatá (born 27 January 1954 in Karviná) is a Czech singer-songwriter. She signed Charter 77 and after she emigrated to Austria. Her debut album called Láska was released in 1985. After the Velvet Revolution, she returned to Czechoslovakia, where she released four more albums. Her most recent studio album Dva divoký koně was released in 2014. For twenty years she lived with poet Ivan Martin Jirous.

Discography
Láska (1985)
Dáša Vokatá (2000)
Bojovníci snů (2008)
Najdi místo pro radost (2011)
Dva divoký koně (2014)

References

External links
Official website

1954 births
Living people
Charter 77 signatories 
Czechoslovak women singers
Czech folk singers
Czech guitarists
Women guitarists
Folk guitarists
People from Karviná
20th-century Czech women singers
21st-century Czech women singers